Sovetskoye is a rural locality (a selo) in Khasavyurtovsky District, Republic of Dagestan, Russia. The population was 1,362 as of 2010. There are 12 streets.

Geography 
Sovetskoye is located 34 km northwest of Khasavyurt (the district's administrative centre) by road. Pervomayskoye is the nearest rural locality.

References 

Rural localities in Khasavyurtovsky District